The section Epidendrum sect. Sarcophylla Rchb.f. is a subsection of subgenus E. subg. Epidendrum of the genus Epidendrum of the Orchidaceae.  In 1861, Reichenbach recognized one species in this section:
 ''E. microphyllum Lindl. 1841